Shabaka Hutchings is a British jazz musician, composer and bandleader. He leads the bands Sons of Kemet and Shabaka and the Ancestors. He is also a member of The Comet Is Coming, performing under the stage name King Shabaka. Hutchings has played saxophone with the Sun Ra Arkestra, Floating Points, Mulatu Astatke, Polar Bear, Melt Yourself Down, Heliocentrics and Zed-U.

Background 
Hutchings was born in London, but moved to Birmingham at the age of two. From the age of six he was raised in his parents' native Barbados. There, as a nine-year-old, he picked up the clarinet and practised along to the hip hop verses of Nas, Notorious BIG and Tupac, as well as the rhythms of Crop Over. He returned to England to receive a classical-music degree on the instrument. In London he joined the Tomorrow's Warriors programme, a blues workshop led by British bassist Gary Crosby, Janine Irons and expat New Orleans trumpeter Abram Wilson, where Hutchings met many of his future collaborators in the burgeoning South East London jazz scene.

Career 
Hutchings and many of his contemporaries shrug off the "jazz" label, eschewing the restriction especially as the many groups reflect influences ranging from acid house and drum & bass, to hiphop and soca, with less of a blues influence than jazz, which reviewers have noted marks a distinction between the London scene as represented by Hutchings and American jazz music.

Shabaka and the Ancestors debuted in 2016 with the album Wisdom of Elders on Gilles Peterson's Brownswood Recordings label. The Comet Is Coming, a trio with keyboardist Dan Leavers and drummer Max Hallett, received a Mercury Prize nomination for their debut album Channel the Spirits, released on The Leaf Label in April 2016. Sons of Kemet, a quartet of saxophone, tuba and two drummers, launched with the album Burn in 2013, followed up with Lest We Forget What We Came Here to Do in 2015, both on the Naim Jazz label, before moving to Impulse! for Your Queen Is a Reptile in 2018, which coincided with a breakout into wider public consciousness of the UK jazz scene, captured by the attention on the Hutchings-directed compilation We Out Here on Brownswood.

In November 2018, Hutchings curated part of the programme for the Dutch Le Guess Who? festival.

In March 2020, Shabaka and the Ancestors released We Are Sent Here by History under Impulse! Records.

In May 2022, Hutchings released his debut solo album Afrikan Culture under the mononym Shabaka.

In December 2020, Hutchings joined a band of British jazz musicians to play on the Bitches Brew-inspired, self-titled album London Brew, which is set for release on 31 March 2023 by Concord Jazz.

Awards and honors 
Hutchings has won a MOBO Award for best jazz act with the Sons of Kemet in 2013, the Paul Hamlyn Composer Award and Jazz Innovation awards from Jazz FM.

References

External links

 
 
 
 Marcus J. Moore, "On 'Wisdom of Elders,' Shabaka Channels the Spirit of South African Jazz" (interview), Bandcamp Daily, 2016.
 Ambassadors of London's Revitalised Jazz Scene come to New York – UK Jazz showcase article in The New York Times featuring Hutchings as part of Jazz re:freshed Outernational showcases, 2017

Living people
Jazz bandleaders
Jazz clarinetists
Jazz saxophonists
Musicians from London
English people of Barbadian descent
21st-century saxophonists
21st-century clarinetists
The Spatial AKA Orchestra members
1984 births
Sons of Kemet members